The two-colored blind snake (Tricheilostoma bicolor) is a species of snake in the family Leptotyphlopidae. This species of snake are small, with a range usually between 15-20cm in length.

References

Tricheilostoma
Reptiles described in 1860